Paul Felix Nemenyi (June 5, 1895 – March 1, 1952) was a Hungarian mathematician and physicist who specialized in continuum mechanics.  He was known for using what he called the inverse or semi-inverse approach, which applied vector field analysis, to obtain numerous exact solutions of the nonlinear equations of gas dynamics, many of them representing rotational flows of nonuniform total energy. His work applied geometrical solutions to fluid dynamics.  In continuum mechanics, "Nemenyi's theorem" proves that, given any net of isothermal curves, there exists a five parameter family of plane stress systems for which these curves are stress trajectories.

Nemenyi's five constant theory for the determination of stress trajectories in plane elastic systems, was subsequently proven by later mathematicians.

He was the father of the statistician Peter Nemenyi and the putative father of former World Chess Champion Bobby Fischer.

Biography

Family 
Neményi was born to a wealthy Hungarian-Jewish family on June 5, 1895 in Fiume (Rijeka) in the Kingdom of Hungary. His grandfather was Zsigmond Neményi. His father Dezső Neményi was one of the directors at Rijeka Refinery (now INA d.d.). Nemenyi attended elementary and high school in Fiume (Rijeka). He graduated from high school in Budapest. Nemenyi's uncle was Dr. Ambrus Neményi, born in Pécel, c. 20 km east of Budapest. The family's name was Neumann until 1871 when they magyarized it to Neményi.  Paul Nemenyi's aunt was Berta Koppély (whose parents were Adolf Koppély (1809-1883) and Rózsa von Hatvany-Deutsch). His family's art collection included works by Klimt, Kandinsky and Matisse.

Hungary at the time, was producing a generation of geniuses in the exact sciences, who would be collectively known as Martians, that included Theodore von Kármán (b. 1881), George de Hevesy (b. 1885), Leó Szilárd (b. 1898), Dennis Gabor (b. 1900), Eugene Wigner (b. 1902), John von Neumann (b. 1903), Edward Teller (b. 1908), and Paul Erdős (b. 1913).

Mathematical career 
A child prodigy in mathematics, at the age of 17, Nemenyi won the Hungarian national mathematics competition. Nemenyi obtained his doctorate in mathematics in Berlin in 1922 and was appointed a lecturer in fluid dynamics at the Technical University of Berlin. In the early 1930s, he published a textbook on mathematical mechanics that became required reading in German universities. Stripped of his position when the Nazis came to power, he also had to leave Hungary where anti-Semitic laws had been enacted, and found work for a time in Copenhagen.

In Germany, Nemenyi belonged to a Socialist party called the ISK, which believed that truth could be arrived at through neo-Kantian Socratic principles. He was an animal-rights supporter and refused to wear anything made of wool. In 1930, Nemenyi entrusted his 3 year old first son, Peter Nemenyi, to be looked after by the socialist vegetarian community, visiting him once a year.

He arrived in the US at the outbreak of World War II. He briefly held a number of teaching positions in succession and took part in hydraulic research at the State University of Iowa. In 1941 he was appointed instructor at the University of Colorado (other sources claim Colorado State University), and in 1944 at the State College of Washington.

Theodore von Kármán wrote of Nemenyi: "When he came to this country, he went to scientific meetings in an open shirt without a tie and was very much disappointed as I advised him to dress as anyone else. He told me that he thought this was a country of freedom, and the man is only judged according to his internal values and not his external appearance."

In 1947 Nemenyi was appointed a physicist with the Naval Ordnance Laboratory, White Oak, Maryland. He was head of the Theoretical Mechanics Section at the laboratory and one of the country's principal authorities on elasticity and fluid dynamics. At the US Navy Research Laboratory, Nemenyi became mentor to Jerald Ericksen, where he put Ericksen to work on the study of water bells.

Nemenyi pioneered what he called the inverse or semi-inverse approach, which applied vector field analysis, to obtain numerous exact solutions of the nonlinear equations of gas dynamics, many of them representing rotational flows of nonuniform total energy. In continuum mechanics, "Nemenyi's theorem" proves that, given any net of isothermal curves, there exists a five parameter family of plane stress systems for which these curves are stress trajectories.

In his exposition, The Main Concepts and Ideas of Fluid Dynamics in their Historical Development, Nemenyi was highly critical of Isaac Newton's inadequate understanding of fluid dynamics.  I. Bernard Cohen argues that Nemenyi pays insufficient attention to Newton's empirical experiments. However, Cohen notes that Nemenyi provides the "most thorough and incisive analyses in print of Newton's work on fluids, written by an obvious master of science. For example, Nemenyi is the only author I have encountered who has shown the weakness of Newton's "proof" at the end of Book 2, that vortices contradict the laws of astronomy.

Nemenyi's scientific knowledge extended well beyond the subjects of his researches. He has been described as having "extreme[ly] versatile interests and erudition". Nemenyi's interest and ability encompassed several nonscientific fields. He collected children's art and sometimes lectured upon it. In 1951, he published a critique of the entire Encyclopædia Britannica, and suggested improvements for such diverse sections as psychology and psychoanalysis.

Nemenyi was also deeply interested in the philosophy of mathematics and mathematical education. He translated David Hilbert and Stefan Cohn-Vossen's Anschauliche Geometrie into English, giving it the title Geometry and the Imagination. Clifford Truesdell writes that it was Nemenyi who first taught him "that mechanics was something deep and beautiful, beyond the ken of schools of "applied mathematics" and "applied mechanics"".

Paul Nemenyi died on March 1, 1952, at the age of 56. He was survived officially by one son: Peter Nemenyi, then a student of mathematics at Princeton University.

Supposed fatherhood of Bobby Fischer

In 2002 Nemenyi was identified as the probable biological father of world chess champion Bobby Fischer, not the man named on Fischer's birth certificate. Additional details on their relationship were reported in 2009.

Selected list of publications

 Posthumous publication, edited by Clifford Truesdell.

Obituaries
Science, 29 August 1952, Vol. 116. no. 3009, pp. 215–216 
Journal of the Washington Academy of Sciences 1953, 43, pp. 62–63 [Clifford Truesdell wrote this obituary and the Science obituary, and they are virtually identical.]

References

External links

1890s births
1952 deaths
Scientists from Rijeka
Hungarian Jews
Jewish emigrants from Nazi Germany to the United States
Hungarian emigrants to the United States
20th-century American physicists
20th-century Hungarian physicists
Jewish American scientists
American people of Hungarian-Jewish descent
Jewish physicists
20th-century chess players
20th-century American Jews
Fluid_dynamicists